Nansel Selbol (born 31 May 1997) is a Nigerian footballer who currently plays for BSK Bijelo Brdo.

Career
After spending time in Nigeria with locals sides Pawas Soccer Academy, Plateau United and C.O.D. United FC, Selbol was given the chance to join the academy team of Sporting Kansas City. After a successful season with the academy, scoring 10 goals in 10 games, Selbol joined Kansas City's United Soccer League affiliate Swope Park Rangers on 6 January 2016. He scored his first goal for the Swope Park Rangers with the game-winner against Tulsa Roughnecks FC on April 2, 2016.

In May 2020, Selbol joined Druga HNL side BSK Bijelo Brdo.

References

External links
KC bio

1997 births
Living people
Nigerian footballers
Nigerian expatriate footballers
Association football midfielders
Sportspeople from Jos
Plateau United F.C. players
Sporting Kansas City II players
Orange County SC players
COD United F.C. players
USL Championship players
Nigerian expatriate sportspeople in the United States
Nigerian expatriate sportspeople in Croatia
Expatriate soccer players in the United States
Expatriate footballers in Croatia